{{Infobox officeholder
|honorific-prefix   =
|name               =Jonathan Loring Austin
|honorific-suffix   =
|image              =
|imagesize          =
|smallimage         =
|caption            =
|order              =
|office             = 2nd Massachusetts Secretary of the Commonwealth
|governor           = Caleb Strong
|predecessor        = John Avery, Jr.
|successor          = William Tudor
|term_start         = 1806
|term_end           = 1808
|office2             = 10th Treasurer and Receiver-General of Massachusetts
|predecessor2        = Thomas Harris
|successor2          = John T. Apthorp
|term_start2         = 1811
|term_end2           = 1812
|office3            =Member of theMassachusetts Senate
|predecessor3        = 
|successor3          = 
|term_start3         = 
|term_end3           = 
|birth_date         =January 2, 1748  
|birth_place        =Boston, Massachusetts
|death_date         =
|death_place        =Boston, Massachusetts
|alma_mater         =Harvard College; 1766.
|party              = Democratic-Republican Party
|profession         =
|spouse             =Hannah Ivers, (March 20, 1756  −1818) m. Boston April 4, 1782.<ref name="OttoNEXUSVIXNo1p25">{{Citation | last = Otto | first = Julie Helen | chapter-url = http://www.newenglandancestors.org/research/services/articles_7732.asp | chapter = Lydia and Her Daughters: A Boston Matrilineal Case Study | title = NEHGS Nexus | volume = IX | issue = 1 | page = 25 | publisher = New England Historic Genealogical Society | location = Boston, Massachusetts | date = February–March 1992 | access-date = June 29, 2010 | archive-url = https://web.archive.org/web/20090628144910/http://www.newenglandancestors.org/research/services/articles_7732.asp | archive-date = June 28, 2009 | url-status = dead }}</ref>
|children=James Treacothie Austin
|residence          =  
|allegiance= United States of America
|branch=Continental Army
|serviceyears=
|rank=Major
|commands= 
|unit= 
|battles= American Revolution
|awards=
}}

Jonathan Loring Austin (January 2, 1748 – May 10, 1826) was an American revolutionary, diplomat and politician who served as the second Massachusetts Secretary of the Commonwealth and the tenth Treasurer and Receiver-General of Massachusetts. Austin was the father of Massachusetts Attorney General James Treacothie Austin.

Early life
Austin was born on January 2, 1748, in Boston, Massachusetts.  Austin graduated from Harvard College in 1766. After he graduated from Harvard, Austin moved to Portsmouth, New Hampshire and became a merchant there.

American Revolutionary War
When the war started Austin became a Major in Langdon's Regiment, and later an aid to General John Sullivan.

Massachusetts Board of War
Austin was the secretary to the Massachusetts Board of War until October 1777,
when he was sent to Paris by Massachusetts to announce to Benjamin Franklin and his associates the news of John Burgoyne's surrender at the Battle of Saratoga.

Diplomatic mission
Franklin soon afterwards sent him on a secret mission to England, where he met many members of the opposition and furnished them with much information concerning American affairs. The trip was full of incident, and, says one of Franklin's biographers (Morse), "brings to mind some of the Jacobite tales of Sir Walter Scott's novels." He carried dispatches to Congress from the United States Commissioners in Paris early in 1779, and in January 1780, was dispatched to Europe to secure loans for Massachusetts in Spain and Holland.

Capture and release
That same month Austin was captured by the British while on this mission. He was later released.  He failed to secure the loan and he returned in the autumn of 1781.

Marriage
Austin married Hannah Ivers, the daughter of James & Hannah (Trecothick) Ivers, in Boston, on April 4, 1782.

Massachusetts Secretary of the Commonwealth
Austin served as Massachusetts Secretary of the Commonwealth for two years, from 1806 to 1808.

Treasurer and Receiver-General of Massachusetts
Austin served as Treasurer and Receiver-General of Massachusetts from 1811 to 1812.

References
 Julie Helen Ott, "Lydia and Her Daughters: A Boston Matrilineal Case Study," NEHGS Nexus, Vol. IX, No. 1, pg. 25 (1992).  
 Cutter, William Richard, ed., Genealogical and Personal Memoirs Relating to the Families of Boston and Eastern Massachusetts,'' Volume IV (New York: Lewis Historical Publishing Company, 1908), 1717.

Footnotes

1748 births
1826 deaths
American Revolutionary War prisoners of war held by Great Britain
Continental Army officers from New Hampshire
Harvard College alumni
Massachusetts state senators
Politicians from Boston
Politicians from Portsmouth, New Hampshire
Secretaries of the Commonwealth of Massachusetts
State treasurers of Massachusetts
American spies during the American Revolution
People from colonial Boston
Military personnel from Massachusetts